Ismagil Gaynutdinov (Ismagil Galejevič Gajnutdinov) was a Soviet architect, educator, and social activist of Tatar ethnicity. He is credited with helping to  build Tatar State Academic Opera and Ballet Theatre named after Musa Jalil in Kazan.

References

1908 births
1977 deaths
People from Tatarstan
People from Kazansky Uyezd
Soviet architects